The Simca 1000 is a small, rear-engined, four-door saloon which was manufactured by the French automaker Simca from 1961 to 1978.

Origins
The origins of the Simca 1000 lie not in France but in Italy. Simca's President-director general, Henri Pigozzi, had been born in Turin and had known Fiat's founder, Giovanni Agnelli, from 1922 until Agnelli's death in 1945. Fiat would remain Simca's dominant share holder until 1963. Pigozzi remained a regular visitor to Fiat's vast Turin operation throughout his time at the head of Simca, and when Pigozzi visited it was as an honoured friend.

Following the launch in 1955 of the well received Fiat 600, Fiat's development department, still headed up by the designer-engineer Dante Giacosa, set about planning for its successor. The replacement foreseen would be a little larger and more powerful than the current car, reflecting growing prosperity in Italy at the time. Two projects were run in parallel: “Project 119” was for a two-door successor, building on the strengths of the current model, while “Project 122” was for a more radically differentiated four door successor. The entrance to the inner sanctum of Fiat's Development Department would have been blocked to most visitors, but Pigozzi's privileged relationship with the Agnellis opened even these doors, and during the late 1950s he took a particular interest in the Department. It became clear that Pigozzi's intentions to extend the Simca range further down in the small car sector aligned closely with Fiat's own “Projects 119” and “122”, intended to build a presence upmarket from the Fiat 600. Pigozzi obtained the agreement of the Fiat directors to select one of the six different rather boxy four-door clay models and mock-ups that then comprised the output of “Project 122” to be developed into Simca's new small car.

The head of the Simca styling department, Mario Revelli de Beaumont, was born in Rome in 1907. He had transferred from General Motors in 1955. Dividing his time between Fiat's Industrial Design Centre at Turin and Simca's Styling Centre at Poissy, Revelli de Beaumont spent the two years between 1959 and 1961 working with Fiat's Felice Mario Boano, developing the Simca 1000 to production readiness. Although the surviving prototypes differ in detail, the basic architecture and boxy shape of the car had evidently been “right first time” and the Simca 1000 of 1961 is entirely recognizable as the model that Pigozzi had selected from Fiat's “Project 122”. In the meantime, in Italy the Fiat 600 continued to sell strongly and there was little sense of urgency about investing to replace it. Management evidently decided that a four-door replacement for the 600 would represent too big a jump from the existing car. However, in 1964 the fruits of “Project 119” became public with the launch of the Fiat 850.

The launch
The "Simca Mille" (as the car is called in French) was inexpensive and, at the time of launch, quite modern, with a brand-new inline-four water-cooled "Poissy engine" of (at this stage) 944 cc. Production began on 27 July 1961, with the official unveiling taking place in the context of a high-profile publicity campaign at the Paris Motor Show on 10 October 1961. At the launch Pigozzi, for obvious reasons, placed great stress on the extent to which the new car marked a landmark achievement for an increasingly independent Simca, and the company's new Development Department at Poissy, while omitting to mention that the Simca 1000 was the product of close collaboration with the company's majority shareholder, Fiat.

Initially, cars could be ordered in one of three colours (red/rouge tison, egg-shell blue/bleu pervenche or off-white/gris-princesse).  However, the show stand featured two additional body colours and the range of colours available to customers was soon expanded. The company's marketing strategy was characteristically imaginative, and having acquired a Paris taxi business in 1958, in November 1961 Simca replaced 50 of that company's Simca Ariane based taxis with 50 much smaller (but evidently spacious enough for the relatively short journeys normally undertaken by taxi) Simca 1000s: thus the stylish little car, often with iconic Paris landmarks in the background, quickly became a familiar sight on the capital's roads. Pictures of Simca 1000s working as Paris taxis turned up in the press. It was nevertheless made clear that this was not a permanent change and after a few months the red and black Simca 1000 taxis were removed from circulation and replaced with more conventionally sized taxis.

The Simca 1000 was also seen in a number of export markets, with left- or right-hand-drive. Already by June 1963 it had found its way to South Africa, where it was sold alongside Chryslers, Dodges, and Plymouths. In the United States, the 1000 sedan was on sale for the 1963 model year, with the Coupé following in 1965.

The car
Use of the RR layout was a first for Simca, although leading auto-makers in France and Germany had been applying it to mainstream small cars for more than a decade. In addition to the rear engine, the fuel tank of the Simca 1000 was located in the rear, behind the rear passenger seat. This gave the car a 35/65 front/rear weight distribution, with an extremely light and nimble front end and a responsive oversteer on curvy roads.

The interior was considered "surprisingly" spacious for this class of car, with plenty of space for four, although the luggage locker under the front hood/bonnet offered only limited space: unlike the similarly configured competitor Renault Dauphine and Renault 8 (and Simca's own prototypes for the Simca 1000) which stowed their spare wheels flat underneath the front luggage locker, the Simca 1000 had its spare wheel stowed vertically in the front luggage compartment, just behind the front bumper. The driver enjoyed an excellent view out: the speedometer pod and minor controls positioned ahead of the driver were basic, although the manufacturer stressed that the glass covering the speedometer was angled to minimize reflections.

Evolution
Over the course of time, the 1000 (whose name was pronounced "mille" in French) was available in a number of versions featuring different equipment levels and variations of the original Type 315 engine. In 1963 the poverty spec Simca 900 was released. In 1966 only the 900C was available, equipped with the more powerful iteration of the 315. In late 1968 the low cost Simca 4 CV (marketed in France as the Simc'4) appeared, powered by a 777 cc unit providing  (DIN), and very competitively priced. The 1000 engine was updated simultaneously, it was now called the type 349. At the top end of the range, the 1118 cc unit from the larger Simca 1100 was added for the 1969 model year (the Simca 1000 was marketed in the US as Simca 1118). The engine was again expanded to 1294cc in 1971 and fitted to 1000 in 1972.

Apart from the standard manual transmission, some versions could be fitted with a three-speed semiautomatic developed by Ferodo. The car underwent a light facelift first shown at the 1968 Paris Motor Show (for the 1969 model year): new hubcaps, redesigned bumpers, bigger headlamps, and square taillights.

The high-specification versions were offered in the British market with a walnut dashboard decor. In 1977, the model was revised for the last time, gaining the new names of 1005/1006 (depending on the specifications), to put it in line with the newer Simca 1307 and its derivatives. Production stopped in 1978 without a direct replacement.

Spain

In Spain, the Simca 1000 was built by Barreiros Diesel from late 1965. In 1970 this company changed names to "Chrysler España, S. A."; early cars feature a chrome "Barreiros" script. The low-specification 844 cc version was sold in Spain only, a market where cars with engines of less than 850 cc received a sizable tax break, as the Simca 900. These originally had . After a hiatus, the 900 returned in 1970 and was then updated in the form of the twin-carb 900 Special of 1973; this model has .

A special Spanish-market model introduced in April 1970 was the  DIN 1000 GT, which had a milder version of the 1204 cc engine as found in the 1200 Coupé. This engine also powered the more luxurious 1000 Special (from 1972). In the spring of 1971 this received twin carburators and became the "1000 Rallye GT", with power increased to  SAE. It had twin black stripes at the very rear and other sporting equipment. This version was discontinued in 1972, essentially being replaced by the 1000 Special. The more powerful French-built Simca 1000 Rallye models were not available in the Spanish market, but in February 1976 the Spanish-built Simca 1000 Rallye appeared. It also did not benefit from disc brakes all around. Its appearance was similar to the French built Rallye 2, with many black stripes and a black front bonnet. As with the rest of the 1000 range, the Spanish Rallye received a facelift with large, rectangular headlamps in September 1976.

Spanish production ended in May 1977. Spanish-built CKD kits were also shipped to Colombia, where Chrysler Colmotores built the car from 1969 until 1977. The 1000 also served as a taxi in Colombia.

Commercial
The Simca 1000 became a popular car in France, and to some extent also in export markets. During 1962, its first full year of production, the manufacturer produced 154,282. The achievement was the more impressive because Simca and its dealers had no recent experience of selling small cars, so apart from first time buyers and customers trading down, all the little car's buyers had to be lured away from competitor manufacturers. As a comparison, France's top seller for 1962 in this class was the Renault Dauphine which had been able to build on more than a decade of class leading sales by the Renault 4CV. Renault produced (including the sporty Ondine versions) 266,767 Dauphines in 1962. The other major competitor in this segment was Citroën whose Ami model managed 85,358 units in 1962 which for the Ami, as for the little Simca, was the first full year of production. Throughout the 1960s and early 1970s the Simca 1000 would continue to appear well up the rankings in the French sales charts, with annual sales remaining above 100,000 without a break until 1974. In its 17 years of production, almost 2 million were sold.

The Simca-Abarth (1964-66) and Simca 1000 Rallye
 In the model's early years, the Italian tuner Abarth was offering modified versions of the 1000, and later Simca itself began offering a "Rallye" version, which helped boost the model's popularity in the motorsport community. The Rallye was followed by the Rallye 1, the Rallye 2 and the Rallye 3.

Simca-Abarth 1150 - 1137 cc -  at 5600 rpm - disk brakes - 11000 F
Simca-Abarth 1150 S - 1137 cc -  at 5600 rpm - disk brakes
Simca-Abarth 1150 SS - 1137 cc -  at 5600 rpm - disk brakes - Option : six speed gear box

The swan song of the Simca 1000 in this series was the Simca 1000 Rallye 3, with a  engine. Only 1000 were produced during the last year of production of the Simca 1000, 1978.

References

External links
"WHAT MAKES SIMCA A GREAT WOMEN'S CAR, TOO?," NEWSWEEK, 10/12/1964 advertisement on Gallery of Graphic Design website

1000
Rear-engined vehicles
Rear-wheel-drive vehicles
Sedans
1970s cars
Cars introduced in 1961
Touring cars